This following is the list of films to which K. Balachander has contributed. He has written and directed nearly 80 films and has worked in more than 100 films either as director or writer in multiple languages – Tamil, Telugu, Malayalam, Hindi and Kannada.

Films

Television serials 
 Raghu Vamsam (SunTV)
 Balachanderin Chinna Thiraigal
Ramani vs Ramani(Raj TV)
 Rayil Sneham (Doordarshan)
 Jannal-1 Sila Nijangal Sila Nyayangal(Sun TV/Raj TV)
 Jannal-2 Adutha Veetu Kavithai (Sun TV/Raj TV)
 Jannal-3 Ammavukku Rendula Raagu
(Sun TV/Raj TV)
 Jannal-4 Marabu Kavithaigal (Raj TV)
 Kasalavu Nesam (Sun TV/Raj TV/ Vasanth TV)
 Kadhal Pagadai (Sun TV)
 Premi (Sun TV/Raj TV)
 Kai Alavu Manasu (Sun TV/ Raj TV/ Vasanth TV)
 Sahana (Jaya TV)
 Shanthi Nilayam (TV series) (Jaya TV)
 Anni (TV series) (Jaya TV)
 Engirrundho Vandhaal (Jaya TV)
 Nilavai pidippom (Raj TV)
 Kadhal Ondru Vangivandhean (Sun TV)
 Comedy Colony (Jaya TV)
 Amudha Oru Aacharyakuri (Kalaignar TV)
 Chhoti Si Asha (Hindi) (Sony Entertainment Television)
 Anandham Vilayadum Veedu (Kalaignar TV)
 Sollathaan Ninaikiren (Zee Tamil)

References

External links 
 
 official website of Kavithalaaya

Indian filmographies
Director filmographies
Male actor filmographies